Andrew "Andy" Musgrave (born 6 March 1990) is a British cross-country skier.  He has competed in the World Cup since 2008 and represented Great Britain at the 2009 World Championships and the 2010, 2014, 2018, and 2022 Winter Olympics.

Personal life and education
Musgrave was born in Dorset, England, to parents Frank and Hilary. Frank worked in the oil industry, and his family lived all over the world due to his employment: they left Dorset when Andrew was one year of age, and he has subsequently lived in Shetland, Alaska, Aberdeenshire and Norway. He originally started competing as an alpine skier after his family moved to Alaska when he was five years old; however, he subsequently switched to snowboarding and cross-country skiing. After moving to Aberdeenshire at the age of 11, he started to focus on cross-country skiing on a serious basis alongside friends Andrew Young and Callum Smith.

He is the younger brother of former cross-country skier Posy Musgrave. He also has another older sister, Heather, and an older brother, Ben. He is a member of Oslo-based sports club Røa IL.

Career
At the 2010 Games in Vancouver, Musgrave finished 51st in the 15 km + 15 km double pursuit, 55th in the 15 km freestyle race, and 58th in the individual sprint event. Musgrave's finishes at the 2009 world championships were 14th in the 4 x 10 km relay, 17th in the team sprint, 45th in the 15 km + 15 km double pursuit, 56th in the 15 km, and 65th in the sprint event.

His best World Cup finish in the 2010–11 season was 31st in a sprint event in Drammen in February 2011. He was only 5/100 behind the 30th place in the qualification race.
At the Junior World Championships in Otepää in 2011, he finished 6th in the 15 km freestyle event; two years later, in Liberec, he came fourth in the same event, only 14.1 seconds behind the bronze medal winner.

At the 2011 World Championships of Oslo, the Freestyle sprint event, Musgrave qualified in 26th place for the heats. In the Men's 50 Kilometre Freestyle, on his 21st birthday, Musgrave finished 59th, with a time of 2:23:54.

Musgrave scored his first World Cup points in the 3.75 km prologue race of the 2011–12 Tour de Ski on 29 December 2011 in Oberhof, where he finished 28th.
To date, his best World Cup result is 11th place in the freestyle sprint stage of the 2012–13 Tour de Ski in Val Müstair. He equalled this result on the 25 km freestyle pursuit stage of the 2015 Tour de Ski in Toblach, setting the fastest time of the day.

In the Norwegian championships freestyle sprint on 17 January 2014, Musgrave won. Two years earlier he came in second on the 15 km freestyle in the Norwegian championships on 26 January 2012. Musgrave did not receive any medals due to his British citizenship. However, Musgrave did take a gold medal at the 2013 Norwegian championships, where he won the team sprint alongside club teammate Martin Johnsrud Sundby (teams at the Norwegian championships may include one foreign competitor).

At the 2014 Winter Olympics, Musgrave qualified in 27th place in the individual sprint, the best-ever performance by a British cross-country skier, but failed to progress from his quarter-final. He then finished 44th in the 15km classical and 53rd in the 50km freestyle. After the Games, Musgrave backed up his victory in the freestyle sprint at the Norwegian championships earlier in the season to win the overall national title.

At the 2017 World Championships in Lahti, Finland, Musgrave scored the best-ever result for a British Nordic skier when he finished fourth in the Men's 50 kilometre freestyle, following an 11th place in the 30 kilometre skiathlon and a 12th in the 15 kilometre classic earlier in the championships. On 16 December 2017, in a 15 kilometre World Cup competition in Toblach, Italy, Musgrave finished in third place.

At the 2018 Winter Olympics, he produced the best-ever finish by a British athlete in Olympic cross-country skiing by finishing seventh in the skiathlon. He repeated that position in the same event at the 2019 World Championships in Seefeld.

Cross-country skiing results
All results are sourced from the International Ski Federation (FIS).

Olympic Games

Distance reduced to 30 km due to weather conditions.

World Championships

World Cup

Season standings

Individual podiums
3 podiums – (2 , 1 )

References

External links
 
  (archive)
 
 
 

1990 births
Cross-country skiers at the 2010 Winter Olympics
Cross-country skiers at the 2014 Winter Olympics
Cross-country skiers at the 2018 Winter Olympics
Cross-country skiers at the 2022 Winter Olympics
Living people
Olympic cross-country skiers of Great Britain
Scottish male cross-country skiers
British male cross-country skiers
Tour de Ski skiers
Scottish expatriates in the United States
Sportspeople from Dorset
British expatriate sportspeople in the United States
British expatriate sportspeople in Norway
Anglo-Scots
Sportspeople from Aberdeenshire